Alcona may refer to:

Alcona, Ontario, a settlement in Sioux Lookout, Kenora District, Ontario, Canada
Alcona, a community in Innisfil, Ontario, Canada
Alcona Township, Township 5, Rooks County, Kansas, U.S.
Alcona, Kansas, 
Alcona County, Michigan, U.S.
Alcona Township, Michigan
Alcona, Michigan, an unincorporated community in Haynes Township

See also 

Algoma (disambiguation)
Alcona Dam

Henry Schoolcraft neologisms